The Flag of Florida is the state flag of Florida, United States. It consists of a red saltire on a white background, with the state seal superimposed on the center. The flag's current design has been in use since May 21, 1985, after the design of the Florida state seal was graphically altered and officially sanctioned for use by state officials. 

In 2001, a survey conducted by the North American Vexillological Association ranked Florida's state flag 34th in design quality of the 72 Canadian provincial, U.S. state and U.S. territorial flags ranked. It is one of three U.S. state flags to feature the words "In God We Trust" (the U.S. motto), with the other two being those of Georgia and Mississippi.

History

Spain was a dynastic union and federation of kingdoms when Juan Ponce de León claimed Florida for the Spanish Crown on April 2, 1513. Colonial authorities used several banners or standards during the first period of settlement and governance in Florida, such as the royal standard of the Crown of Castile in Pensacola and the Cross of Burgundy in St. Augustine. As with other Spanish territories, the Burgundian saltire was generally used in Florida to represent collective Spanish sovereignty between 1513 and 1821. 

In 1763, Spain passed control of Florida to Great Britain via the Treaty of Paris, following the latter's victory over France in the Seven Years' War, in exchange for other territory. Great Britain used the original union flag with the white diagonal stripes in Florida during this brief period. The British also divided the Florida territory into East Florida, with its capital at St. Augustine, and West Florida, with its capital at Pensacola. The border was the Apalachicola River.

Spain regained control of the Florida Provinces (las Floridas) after the Siege of Pensacola and the Treaty of Paris following the American Revolutionary War, when Britain ceded its territories east of the Mississippi River. In 1785, King Charles III chose a new naval and battle flag for Spain, which had become a more centralized nation-state, and its crown territories. This tri-band of red-gold-red was used with the Burgundian saltire in the provinces of East and West Florida until they joined the United States in 1821. Florida was admitted as a state in 1845.

Provisional flag after secession
Between 1821 and 1861, Florida had no official flag. In 1845, at the inauguration of Governor William D. Moseley, a flag was flown with bars of blue, gold, red, white and green, along with the motto "Let Us Alone"; however, this never was an official flag.

In January 1861 Florida declared that it had seceded from the Union and was now a "sovereign and independent nation", alluding to the preamble in its Constitution of 1838. The state used the Naval Ensign of Texas as a provisional flag between January and September 1861.  It also used this flag when Floridian forces took control of U.S. forts and a Navy yard in Pensacola. Colonel William H. Chase was commander of Floridian troops, and the flag is also referred to as the Chase Flag. 

Later that year, the Florida Legislature passed a law authorizing Governor Perry to design an official flag. His design was the tri-band of the Confederacy but with the blue field extending down and the new seal of Florida placed within the blue field. As a member of the Confederacy, Florida saw use of all three versions of the Confederate flag. The Bonnie Blue flag, previously the flag of the short-lived Republic of West Florida, was briefly used as an unofficial flag of the Confederacy. It features a single five-point star centered in a blue background.

Florida constitution of 1868
Between 1868 and 1900, the flag of Florida was the state seal on a white background. In a discrepancy, however, a later version of the state seal depicts a steamboat with a white flag that includes a red saltire, similar to Florida's current flag. In the late 1890s, Florida governor Francis P. Fleming advocated adding a red St. Andrew's Cross so that the flag would not appear to be a white flag of truce if hanging limp on a flagpole. Floridians approved the addition of St. Andrew's Cross by popular referendum in 1900. The red saltire of the Cross of Burgundy represents the cross on which St. Andrew was crucified, and the standard is frequently displayed today in Florida's historic Spanish settlements, such as St. Augustine.

Historical progression of designs

Other

Additional perspectives
Some historians interpret the addition of a red saltire as a commemoration of Florida's contributions to the Confederacy by Governor Francis P. Fleming, who served in the 2nd Florida Regiment, Confederate army.  The addition was made during a period promoting the "Lost Cause" of the antebellum South, around the time of the flag's change. According to historian John M. Coski, the Florida legislature adopted its new flag near the time when it disenfranchised African Americans and passed new Jim Crow laws and segregation. Other former Confederate slave states, such as Mississippi and Alabama, also adopted new state flags around the same time that they instituted Jim Crow segregation laws. 

Not all historians agree with assertions about association with the Confederacy. James C. Clark, a lecturer in the University of Central Florida's history department, does not believe that Fleming's new flag had anything to do with the Confederacy. "That St. Andrew's Cross that Fleming added, the red X, dates back to the original flag the Spanish flew over Florida in the 16th century." Similarly, Canter Brown Jr., a Florida state-educated historian who has written extensively on Florida history, says he's "seen no specific evidence linking this flag to the Confederate one."

See also

 List of flags by design
 List of Florida state symbols
 List of U.S. state, district, and territorial insignia

References

External links

 

 
1868 establishments in Florida
Florida
Florida
Symbols of Florida
Flag controversies in the United States
Florida
Controversies in Florida